The following is a list of Somali films.

A
 Ali Iyo Awrala (2006)
 Ambad (2011)
 Ayaanle (2022)

C
 Carara (2009)
 Charcoal Traffic (2008)
 Ciyaar Mood (1986)
 La Conchiglia (1992)

D
 Dan Iyo Xarrago (1973)
 Dhig ama Dhaqo (2011)
 Dub'aad (1920s–1950s)

F
 Fire Eyes (1994)

G
 Geedka nolosha (1987)

H
 Ha Eersan Dubai (2012)

J
 Judaan 2016

L
 Love Does Not Know Obstacles (1961)

M
 My Cousin the Pirate (2010)
 Miyo Iyo Magaalo (1968)

P
 The Parching Winds of Somalia (1984)
 Pastoral and Urban Life (1969)

R
 Rajo (2003)

S
 Shalaay (2005)
 Soldiers of Bronze (1920s–1950s)
 Somalia (1912)
 Somalia: Le bellezze del fiume Nebi (1913)
 The Somali Darwish (1984)
 A Somali Dervish (1983)
 Somalia Dervishes (1985)
 Somalia: Gheledi (1913)
 Somalia italiana (1913)
 Sotto la Croce del Sud - Somalia Italiana (1926)

V
 Viaggio di S.M. il Re in Somalia (novembre-dicembre 1934) (1934)
 Visioni della Somalia italiana (1929)

W
 Warmooge (2006)

X
 Xaaskayga Araweelo (2006)

See also
 Cinema of Somalia
 Somali Film Agency
 Somaliwood
 List of Somalian submissions for the Academy Award for Best International Feature Film

References
 
 
 
 
 IMDB - Somalia
 
 
 
 
 
 
 

Somali-language films